Carazo is a municipality located in the province of Burgos, Castile and León, Spain.

People from Carazo
 Pedro Segura y Sáenz (4 December 1880—8 April 1957) -  Cardinal of the Roman Catholic Church.

References

Municipalities in the Province of Burgos